ID Finance is a financial technology company founded in 2012 by Boris Batine and Alexander Dunaev. It is predominantly focused on emerging markets, which are characterized by noncompetitive financial services, limited availability of credit and high barriers to entry.

Technology
ID Finance's proprietary IT and risk management system collects and analyses thousands of data points in order to process loan applications in real time over the internet.

Operations
ID Finance is headquartered in Barcelona.

It was formally split from its operations Russia, the CIS region and Eastern Europe (which became IDF Eurasia) in 2018.

The company's head office is located in Barcelona. The company employs more than 400 people. The company owns the brands MoneyMan (short-term online lending service), AmmoPay (automated POS lending service) and Solva (online service for issuing medium-term loans up to a year). ID Finance operates in the markets of Russia, Spain (Moneyman.es, Plazo.es), Kazakhstan, Georgia, Poland, Brazil and Mexico. ID Finance also plans to enter the markets of Colombia, Peru and the USA.

Funding
The company has raised €60m since 2015 including €5.8m of equity and €54m through debt.

References

External links 
 

Financial services companies of Russia
Financial technology companies
Companies based in Barcelona
Spanish companies established in 2012